Hold Me Tight (original French title Serre Moi Fort) is a 2021 French drama film written and directed by Mathieu Amalric, based on the play Je reviens de loin by Claudine Galéa. It stars Vicky Krieps as Clarisse, a woman who abandons her husband and children. The film premiered in the Official Selection at the 74th Cannes Film Festival on 14 July 2021.

Synopsis
Clarisse (Vicky Krieps) is a woman on the run from her family for reasons that aren't immediately clear. Gliding between reality and fiction, the film alternates between Clarisse's adventures on the road and scenes of her abandoned husband Marc (Arieh Worthalter) as he struggles to care for his children at home.

Cast
 Vicky Krieps as Clarisse
 Arieh Worthalter as Marc, Clarisse's husband
 Anne-Sophie Bowen-Chatet as Lucie, Clarisse and Marc's daughter
 Sacha Ardilly as Paul, Clarisse and Marc's son

Production
According to director Mathieu Amalric, the film was shot in segments months apart in order to capture multiple seasons, ending in February 2020.

Release
The film premiered in the Official Selection at the 74th Cannes Film Festival on 14 July 2021. It had its official release in France on 8 September 2021. It was released in the United States a year later on 9 September 2022, and was released on VOD by Kino Lorber on November 22, 2022.

Reception

Box office
Hold Me Tight grossed $74,723 in North America, and $852,244 in other territories for a worldwide total of $926,967.

Critical response
Hold Me Tight has received critical acclaim. On review aggregator Rotten Tomatoes, the film has an approval rating of 84% based on 45 reviews, with a weighted average of 7.3/10. The website's critical consensus reads, "Hold Me Tight trips over style while reaching for substance; fortunately, it has Vicky Krieps' stellar performance to keep it from falling down." On Metacritic, the film holds an 82 out of 100 rating, based on 13 reviews, indicating "universal acclaim".

Critic Michael O'Sullivan praised the film's depiction of grief in a 3 out of 4 star review for The Washington Post, describing it as a "strange and compelling film, a study of grief that somehow is at once moving and detached, in the way that people in mourning sometimes engage in denial-like displacement activities: behavior that's inappropriate to the emotion at hand." In her 3.5 out of 4 star review for Indiewire, critic Susannah Gruder credited both Amalric's direction and Kriep's leading performance, saying "[Kriep's] wispy elegance is tempered by a clumsy charm as she lovingly strokes her daughter's hair, or floats through the world in her newly-solo life. Her general state of dazed detachment gives weight to one particularly explosive outburst of anger and pain toward the film's end, devastating in its cathartic confrontation with reality."

References

External links
 
 

2021 films
2021 drama films
2020s French films
French films based on plays